Jacinta Umunnakwe is a Nigerian boxer.She won a bronze medal in the 2022 Commonwealth Games in the Middleweight boxing .

References 

Living people
Boxers at the 2022 Commonwealth Games
Commonwealth Games competitors for Nigeria
Middleweight boxers
1993 births
Commonwealth Games bronze medallists for Nigeria
Commonwealth Games medallists in boxing
21st-century Nigerian women
Medallists at the 2022 Commonwealth Games